West Kinderhook is a former settlement on the border between Tipton County and Hamilton County in Indiana, United States.

History

West Kinderhook was surveyed and platted in 1841 by Silas Blount, M.D.. The village was located in both Tipton and Hamilton Counties. A few plots of land were sold; however, growth was short-lived and stopped suddenly. The Buena Vista railroad station was built  miles west of West Kinderhook, which led to West Kinderhook's demise.

References

Geography of Tipton County, Indiana
Former populated places in Indiana